Taheriyeh-ye Do (also Romanized as Ţāherīyeh-ye Do; also known as Taheriyehé Dowé Mo’allayeh) is a village in Esmailiyeh Rural District, in the Central District of Ahvaz County, Khuzestan Province, Iran. At the 2006 census, its population was 194, in 37 families.

References 

Populated places in Ahvaz County